The Vigário Geral Massacre (Chacina de Vigário Geral in Portuguese) occurred on August 29, 1993, at the favela of Vigário Geral, located in the north of Rio de Janeiro city. A death squad composed of Rio Military Police was responsible for carrying out the act of violence. The group supposedly did so out of revenge for the killing of four police officers two days prior, who were allegedly involved in the extortion of drug traffickers. After arriving to the favela of Vigário Geral on August 29, 1993, the squad spent two hours traveling around wearing hoods over their heads and sporadically shooting at local residents, leaving 21 innocent people dead. "Among the deceased were seven men playing cards in a bar and eight members of a family, including a 15-year-old girl, killed inside their home." After the federal and Rio de Janeiro state governments commenced a series of official investigations that year, charges were brought against thirty three people: twenty-eight military policemen who were believed to belong to infamous death squad "Cavalos Corredores" (the "Galloping Horses"), three civil policemen and two civilian employees of the civil police. By 1998, the number of people charged increased to the total of fifty-two, but only two had actually been convicted thus far. Six policeman had been convicted as of 2003, yet according to a BBC newspaper published in August, only two were actually in prison as the other four were released with the expiration of the time periods for their appeal hearings.

Implications of the Vigário Geral massacre 
The theme that has continued to dominate Brazilian society from the early twentieth century up until the present, is the accepting attitude held by middle-upper class citizens and policemen towards the use of violence. Police violence directed towards citizens continues to be a problem in Brazil decades after the 1993 Vigário Geral Massacre, and is evident in its murder statistics. In one annual Brazilian Forum on Public Security report, it found that police killed 2,212 people in 2013, and increasing to a total of 3,022 the following year, Brazil's national murder rate was 30 deaths for every 100,000 people. This data contrasts greatly with that of the United States, which, according to the FBI's Criminal Justice Information Services Division crime report of 2013, had a much lower rate of only 4.5 murders for every 100,000 people.

One major factor that directly contributes to Brazil's high murder rate (police killing citizens, and citizens killing each other and officers) are its laws on both intentional and unintentional murder. According to Brazil's homicide laws, the penalty for intentional murder ranges from six to twenty years of imprisonment except in more severe instances which it could increase to thirty, and only one to three years for unintentional homicides. As if to favor those who commit serious felonies, Brazilian law states that the maximum penalty for any crime is 30 years, and those sentenced to more than 19 years in prison are automatically granted retrials.

In 1998, Chicago Tribune Foreign Correspondent Laurie Goering made several interesting points in her article, showing that there was more to Brazil's murder culture than just its comparatively (to the U.S. and elsewhere) lenient laws. Due to the fact that Brazil's court systems were slow, inconsistent, saw only 8 percent of all cases, and brought "showy sentences" with small jail time, Goering explained that "most people favor street justice by police, including executions of criminals caught in the act."

See also
List of massacres in Brazil

References

External links
“Murder.” The Federal Bureau Of Investigation, 2013.    
Rocha, Jan. “Rio Police Killings Condemned.” BBC, August 28, 2003, sec. Americas. http://news.bbc.co.uk/2/hi/americas/3190101.stm.   
“BRAZIL: RIO DE JANEIRO 2003: CANDELARIA AND VIGARIO GERAL 10 YEARS ON.” Amnesty International, August 27, 2003. https://www.amnesty.org/en/documents/amr19/015/2003/en/.   
“THE KILLINGS IN CANDELÁRIA AND VIGÁRIO GERAL: The Urgent Need To Police the Brazilian Police.” Human Rights Watch, November 1993. 

Mass murder in 1993
August 1993 events in South America
Massacres in 1993
Mass shootings in Brazil
Massacres in Brazil
1993 in Brazil
Police brutality in Brazil
People murdered by organized crime
1993 murders in Brazil
1993 mass shootings in South America